The Revival Centres International is a Pentecostal church with its headquarters in Melbourne, Australia. It has approximately 300 centres in 22 countries including Australia, New Zealand, Canada, Fiji, Italy, Kenya, Papua New Guinea, Malawi, the United Kingdom and the United States of America.

The Revival Centres was formed as a separate identity from the Commonwealth Revival Crusade in 1958, and at a short time later became a registered denomination pursuant to the Marriage Act 1961 (Cth), as Revival Centres of Australia.

The Church has a strong emphasis on the need to show evidence of glossolalia or "speaking in tongues" to demonstrate receiving the Holy Spirit to be considered a full member of the Church and a saved Christian. Revival Centres International bases its glossolalia teaching on a literal interpretation of Acts 2, a trait with some other Pentecostal groups. Revival Centres does not affiliate with any other religious organisation and are not a member of the World Council of Churches.

Church genealogy

Early history

The predecessor of the Revival Centres was the Commonwealth Revival Crusade, which began in 1945 and was itself a conjunction of Assembly of God (Leo Harris) and British-Israel-World Federation (Tom Foster) elements. In 1958, The Revival Centres of Australia (as they were then known), led by Noel Hollins and Lloyd Longfield, was formed as a schism from the Commonwealth Revival Crusade (a group which later became Christian Revival Crusade and then CRC Churches International). In 1972, the group founders split into two separate organisations – with Lloyd Longfield's group remaining officially the 'Revival Centres of Australia' and Noel Hollins leaving to form the 'Geelong Revival Centres' based in Geelong, Victoria.

Carn Brae

One of the earliest Revival Centre purchases was in March 1966, when the Revival Centres paid almost $100,000 for a property in Harcourt Street, Auburn in Melbourne to develop as a church meeting place. The land included a large seventeen-roomed mansion which had formerly been the residence of the Lord Mayor of Melbourne, known as Carn Brae. Nearby residents feared that the building of a hall on the property would spoil the previously quiet character of the area, and their protests made newspaper headlines both in Victoria and interstate. Permission to build a hall on the property was ultimately denied. Lloyd Longfield lived in the property for several years, and used the property for various church related functions.

Forum Theatre

The Forum Theatre (formerly known as the "State Theatre") is a famous "Moorish Revival" style theatre located on the corner of Flinders Street and Russell Street in the central business district of Melbourne, Australia. When the theatre was first built by Bohringer, Taylor & Johnson in 1929, the theatre had the largest seating capacity in Australia, holding 3371 people. In 1985 it was purchased by the Revival Centres International and was used as its International headquarters. In 1995 it was sold to Staged Developments Australia, who redeveloped it for use as a film and concert venue.

General meeting format

The Revival Centres normally holds a midweek meeting (a small scale house meeting) and then at least one Sunday assembly meeting. Both meeting types are expected to contain most of the following aspects:

Community singing or "choruses" led by a song leader based on Christian themes.
Welcome and opening prayer.
Personal Testimonies, given by church members.
Sermon or "talk" given by a pastor or a male leader using Bible references.
Sharing of the Communion "elements" (bread and grape juice) representing Body and Blood of Christ. Normally once a week at the Sunday meeting.
Operation of the Spirituals Gifts or "Voice Gifts" of the Holy Spirit by church members. i.e. containing speaking in tongues, interpretation of that tongue and prophecy (i.e. meaning professing the word of God).
Prayer line or "laying on of hands" for people with needs, by church leaders.
Donations or "tithing".
Church Activities Announcements.
Closing prayer.
Social time after meeting.

Spiritual gatherings and practices
A common optional practice for Revival Centres members is to gather together each year at various camp venues during Christmas and Easter holidays as a Spiritual Retreat. Each year the Melbourne assembly hosts an international convention during the Australian Queen's Birthday weekend. Some countries or zonal areas holds Annual Local Rallies over the year, usually on a localized anniversary holiday. Revival Centres members are voluntary active in evangelising activities or "outreaching" either by personal or group participation. Various assemblies run activities for a Young Revivalists group (generally in the 10 to 14 years age group), the Young People group (generally 15 to 21 years age group) and the Revival Rangers group (5 to 10 years age group).

Missions

Revival Centres International emphasis has been on equipping local people to run their own assemblies. They have no standing missionaries, preferring to train and encourage the locals in the gospel and in church leadership and therefore avoiding a paternalistic approach. They strongly support and encourage members in the "mission fields" by regular visits, and where financially possible, by bringing groups to the main annual convention in Australia in June each year. Visits are made by pastors and officers as part of an ongoing program of support, but also by groups of assembly members and young peoples groups.

Statement of Beliefs

The core belief of Revival Centres International is the necessity of speaking in tongues as evidence of a person receiving the Holy Spirit. They also maintain a strong belief that God could heal them from anything and that they have ongoing life changing transformations.

The Revival Centres International's statement of beliefs are listed as follows;

 The infallibility of the Word of God.
 Jesus is the Son of God.
 The Gospel of his death and resurrection and directive to repent, be baptised, receive the Holy Spirit.
 Baptism into the Body of Christ (the Church) through the Holy Spirit with the evidence of speaking in tongues.
 The miraculous gifts of the Holy Spirit in the Church.
 Prayer for the sick and faith healing by the power of God.
 The Bible identifies the Anglo-Saxon people with the Old Testament nation of Israel, describes modern nations and gives signs of the imminent return of Jesus.

British Israelism and statements on racism

Revival Centres International statement about British Israelism is that it draws together Biblical and historical clues to identify which peoples represent the fulfillment of God's promises to the Old Testament nation of Israel. They believe that God's intention for Israel was that they would be a blessing to all the families (nations, ethnic groupings etc.) of the earth, not that they would form some kind of master race. Some of these "British Israel" Identification includes linking emblems of modern-day nations to Israel emblems from the Bible, such as the UK Royal Coat of Arms and the Seal of the President of the United States. The identifications also includes links of the mottos of the emblems to biblical descriptions.

Revival Centres has stated that they believe that all human beings have been created in the image of God and have equal value in God's sight and that salvation is equally open to all human beings. They noted that they have members from all major ethnic groups and that church members share fellowship with members from all ethnic groups and intermarry.

Second Coming

The Revival Centres believes and adheres to an interpretation of Jesus' prophecies about his soon return. During the 1980s, The Revival Centres taught that Armageddon and Jesus's return were imminent – holding events such as the "Survival '82" outreach.

In a Melbourne Revival Centre book, entitled The Throne of David and the Return of Christ, at the end of chapter nine, it says "the generation of people who were alive in 1917 would still be alive when all the prophecies concerning the return of Jesus Christ reach fulfillment." The chapter acknowledges that while "1917 Generation" is not a Bible term, it later speculates in the same chapter that a "generation" scripturally implies that it is forty years. This chapter explains that it lines up with the prophesied signs of the return of Christ examined in the chapter seven as being fulfilled by 1957. Therefore, Revival Centres International teaches the imminent return of Jesus Christ based on the precept that the prophesied signs of his return have been fulfilled.

The Stone of Scone is believed to be the Stone of Destiny and also believed to be the biblical Jacob's Pillow Stone which is used for the coronation of many kings. It is speculated by the Revival Centres that Jesus will return and be crowned on this Coronation Stone because of its biblical history.

Publications

While Revival Centres International acknowledges certain books as being useful for bible study, they have published a number of books themselves such as "The Sabbath", "Jacob vs Esau", "The Commonwealth of Israel" and "The Throne of David and the Return of Christ". They also publish articles such as "An Introduction to the Emblems of Israel", "The Emblems of Israel" and "Wisdom from the Preaching of the Word of God".

They regularly publish a magazine called "Voice of Revival" since 1959, that gave insight into their doctrine and their life, to which they made no claim that the magazine has infallibility, leaving such claim only to the Word of God i.e. the Bible.

In the 1980s, they had previously publish their own foolscap report to deliver the various of activities in their assemblies around the world to all their pastors. Eventually in 1991, after encouragement from Lloyd Longfield, this became a magazine, containing updated church developments and news around the world assemblies, being issued four times a year. Later in 1994, this magazine developed into the "Newsletter" which includes colour photos and was issued twice-yearly in February and July. In 2006, the Newsletter was replaced by the church's online news section on their official website front page. The online news articles are contributed by various Revival Centres International editors around the world.

A monthly email newsletter can be freely subscribed to from their official website for the public as well as free podcasts of talks and free mp3 download of one of their music albums.

Doctrinal schisms and refining church identity

In 1991, a number of related assemblies in Europe broke their loose connection with the Revival Centres International and formed the Christian Assemblies International under Scott Williams. A further schism occurred in 1995, when a large group (comprising approximately half of the Australian assemblies) aligned with the Adelaide assembly formed The Revival Fellowship, citing a disagreement over the revised fornication policy (i.e. church members who engaged with sex outside of marriage would no longer be able to attend Revival Centres International in perpetuity.)

Revival Centres International, former owner of the Forum Theatre in the city, had bought the Campion Books premises in Middleborough Rd, Box Hill South and moved in at the end of April 1998. In 1998, Lloyd Longfield handed leadership to his son, Simon Longfield, who continues to lead the group.

After a combination of doctrinal schisms and the change of leadership, a number of revisions were made to refine Revival Centres International's spiritual direction and church identify.

Bible Numerics

In June 1999, Revival Centres International revised its position on Bible Numerics. In the past, the Revival Centres considered Bible Numerics, as pioneered by Ivan Panin, as one of the proofs for the divine authorship of the Bible, although it had never formed part of their statement of beliefs.

Current Revival Centre thought is that these supposed intricate numerical patterns are in fact a feature of any text, in any language. Outlined in a Revival Centres paper, written by Geoff Beggs dated 9 February 1999, this position was formed following study and consideration of work done by a mathematician named Brendon MacKay. The original work and associated computer program was developed by Brendon MacKay working at the Australian National University of Canberra and was used to analyze Bible Numerics.

Revision of the Code of Conduct

Years ago, Lloyd Longfield developed the "Code of Conduct" of RCI after he had become concerned when, at a church meeting, he saw that a young man had attended the meeting with his new girlfriend while his girlfriend of the previous week sat at the back of the church, crying. He devised the code of conduct, which mentioned conduct which the church regarded as unacceptable.

Primarily focused towards the youth of the church, the code of conduct dealt with a wide range of guidelines for "living a righteous life" covering areas of acceptable behavior and activities to relationships and appearances. For every topic, there was a biblical quotation and a number of propositions which follow from that text. Its introduction stated "...these requirements are mandatory for the safety of us all. As the worldly influences continue to grow we must become more direct in our campaign to keep unsavoury practices out of the Church – the body of Christ!"

Members failing to comply with these guidelines would be dealt with by the local pastor resulting in the possibilities of counseling, education, restrictions/conditions in participation in church ran activities, temporary or permanent dismissal from the church, depending on the severity of the situation.

Lloyd stated the code did not assert the guidelines within were based on a specific command in the Bible. He said that the code contained suggestions, observations or regulations to help people apply the Scriptures in their everyday lives and in the context of a changing world. The code was devised by the leadership of the Church to help to contribute to the well being of its members. The code of conduct was revised each year or as different situations arose. The code was then distributed throughout RCI.

After the 1995 schism and then change of leadership from Lloyd Longfield to Simon Longfield in 1998, Revival Centres International had a revision on the Code of Conduct. It was found that most of the rules and regulations that were written in the code were based on many moral dilemmas concerning fornication and other behavioral problems that the people of the church faced. It was concluded that many rules and regulations contained in the code of conduct had not stressed enough the importance of personal ownership for each members' actions and in practice had problems de-emphasizing many other individual/external influence on each set of circumstances that church members faced.

The intention of the code of conduct was to address broader areas of concerns that church members, especially young people, would find the most pressure, misleading information or harm to their spiritual walk. The onus is now focused on each church member to " . . . work out your own salvation with fear and trembling." This means in practice that each church member is encouraged to accept the guidance of scripture in these matters.

The natural result of this revision means that there was more allowance for church members to take even more personal responsibility for their spiritual growth and less personal intervention by the church oversight unless it was absolutely necessary or there was an urgent concern raised. Therefore, the "Code of Conduct" was removed and combined with the church's simplified stand against fornication among members since 1995, had greatly clarified many decision making within the Church members in aspects of their own spiritual walk. This also means there was a moving away from the oversight being seen as a type of confessional outlet and being more of a "shepherd" or "guide".

Criticism
The Church's beliefs and practices have given rise to some criticism over its treatment of members and former members. In mid-April 1998, weeks prior to the church moving in the Campion Books premises in Middleborough Rd, Box Hill South from the Forum Theatre, some former members of Revival Centres International spoke out, via the Whitehorse Gazette, in a bid to warn Whitehorse residents of the organisation's impending move to the area so as to raise community awareness about the Church. The Whitehorse Gazette also covered the group founder, Lloyd Longfield's response in dismissing such concerns.

Concerns raised by some former members includes the use of guilt, fear, shame and mind control as well as church activities occupying members time spent away from other non-membered family. Other concerns raised by former members were that group members are unable to criticise or question the leaders in any way or associate with any other churches.

A recent podcast called “I was a teenage fundamentalist” had a detailed episode on an anonymous Australian’s teenagers experience of being a young member of the revival centres in the late 1980s . 
Tom Tilley is an Australian journalist formerly of JJJ who has also written a book about growing up in the Revival Centres called Speaking in Tongues.

Lloyd Longfield says that the Revival Centres International did not believe it was the only true Church but did believe its teachings were the only true way. He dismissed suggestions the group was a cult or controlled and dominated its members. "You come along and have a wonderful experience in the Lord", he said. "You are born again and from that time on you walk, carefully and more reasonably." "Every religious group is a cult. I suppose they say these things because they think we're out of line."

Longfield said those who left the group did so because they could not follow the Bible. He denied members were told to ignore them. "Some people leave because the group doesn't suit them. They cut themselves off 90 per cent of the time", he said. "It's not that no one can speak to them, they're just not in fellowship any more. They have different interests and we don't see them any more." Longfield said Church members were welcome to discuss concerns with the leaders but those who left the Church chose not to.

Longfield defended the Church's actions of "disfellowshipping" members for breaking the rules. He said in other churches people who disobeyed the Bible were given a "smack on the wrist" and were allowed to keep attending services. "The church as a rehabilitation centre is ridiculous", Longfield said.

See also
 Pre-Adamite
 Ten Lost Tribes

References

External links

The Revival Centres International Official Website

British Israelism
Protestantism in Australia
Pentecostal churches in Melbourne
Christian denominations in New Zealand
Pentecostal denominations